The 2015–16 season is Dagenham & Redbridge's 9th season in the Football League and fifth consecutive season in League Two. Along with competing in League Two, the club will also participate in the FA Cup, League Cup and League Trophy. The season covers the period from 1 July 2015 to 30 June 2016.

Match details

Football League Two

League table

Matches

FA Cup

Football League Cup

Football League Trophy

Transfers

In

 Brackets around club names denote the player's contract with that club had expired before he joined Dagenham & Redbridge.

Out

 Brackets around club names denote the player joined that club after his Dagenham & Redbridge contract expired.

Loans in

Loans out

Appearances and goals
Source:
Numbers in parentheses denote appearances as substitute.
Players with names struck through and marked  left the club during the playing season.
Players with names in italics and marked * were on loan from another club with Dagenham & Redbridge.
Players listed with no appearances have been in the matchday squad but only as unused substitutes.
Key to positions: GK – Goalkeeper; DF – Defender; MF – Midfielder; FW – Forward

References

Dagenham and Redbridge
Dagenham & Redbridge F.C. seasons